Interstate 465 (I-465), also known as the USS Indianapolis Memorial Highway, is the beltway circling Indianapolis, Indiana, United States. It lies almost completely within the boundaries of Marion County, except for two short sections on the north leg in Boone and Hamilton counties. It intersects with I-65, I-69, I-70, and I-74 and provides additional access to I-65 via I-865.

Route description

All U.S. and state highways that formerly were routed through the central part of Indianapolis are now routed concurrently with I-465. Only I-65 and I-70 run through Downtown Indianapolis. The affected highways are:

I-74, running counterclockwise from exit 16 to exit 49
US 31, running counterclockwise from exit 2 to exit 31
US 36, running counterclockwise from exit 13 to exit 42
US 40, running counterclockwise from exit 12 to exit 46
US 52, running clockwise from exit 25 to exit 47
US 421, running counterclockwise from exit 49 to exit 27
SR 37, running counterclockwise from exit 4 to exit 37
SR 67, running counterclockwise from exit 8 to exit 42
In addition, the I-69 extension will run counterclockwise from future exit 5 to exit 37. When the interchange opens, it is expected the SR 37 designation will be removed from I-465 as well as I-69.

An approximately  section between exits 46 and 47 carries eight routes: I-465, US 31, US 36, US 40, US 52, US 421, SR 37, and SR 67, the largest concurrency in the U.S. In most cases, route markers other than I-74's are not posted along I-465 itself; rather, signs on the entrance ramps direct traffic traveling a particular route to follow I-465 to a specific exit to continue on that route.

History

Planning and alignment selection
A beltway for Indianapolis was part of the original plan of the Interstate Highway System in 1955. The general alignment was to be either on or adjacent to the now-defunct SR 100, which, by then, had only two completed legs—on the north side, along 86th Street west of the White River and 82nd Street east of the river, and on the east side, along Shadeland Avenue. On the city's west side, an alignment corridor paralleling High School Road was preferred, and, on the south side, one between Hanna Avenue and Thompson Road had been proposed. Development along 86th Street made its use unfeasible for I-465, so a 91st Street alignment was initially proposed. This proved to be controversial and caused many delays in final alignment selection for the north leg, postponing its construction by several years.

Initial construction (1959–1970)
The I-465 beltway was constructed in segments. There were 16 segments along the original proposed semicircumferential alignment between I-65 in Boone County at exit 129 and that same highway  to the south at exit 123 in Marion County. Indiana highway officials recognized the value of having the route be a full circumferential, so using non-Interstate federal funding and employing a temporary designation of SR 100, they planned a separate 17th segment northward between I-65 at its exit 123 and the north leg of I-465 in Boone County. By the time that added section was completed in 1970, Indiana had obtained federal approval to sign it as I-465 as well, resulting in the creation of a dogleg section of I-465 outside of the loop (now signed as I-865).

State highway officials concentrated on building the west and south legs of I-465 early in the overall project, since they were the missing portions of the SR 100 concept. Construction began in 1959, and the first section of the I-465 beltway to be completed was the portion on the west leg between I-65 near Eagle Creek Park and I-74/US 136 in Speedway. That section was opened to traffic on September 26, 1961, simultaneously with the adjacent section of I-65 northwest from there running  to 71st Street. By July 18, 1962, all four segments of the original west leg were open between SR 67 (Kentucky Avenue) and I-65, but the interchange with I-70 in that stretch was not completed until much later that decade when the segment of that route from I-465 west to SR 43 opened in 1968.

The south side sections were the next to be completed, with three opening in the second half of 1963 and two more on October 15, 1964. This completed both the south leg and the first segment of the east leg and included a connection from a point just north of the Raymond Street grade separation to SR 100 (Shadeland Avenue) at Washington Street (US 40). With these sections open, the full length of I-74's concurrency over I-465 was now available for motorists.

With SR 100/Shadeland Avenue connected to the full southern and western bypass of Indianapolis, work on I-465's east leg slowed, delaying the opening of the next segment over three years. In January 1968, two sections of the east leg, between US 36/SR 67 (Pendleton Pike) and the SR 100 junction near Raymond Street, were completed and opened a day apart. This allowed through traffic from both US 36 and SR 67 to bypass the increasingly congested SR 100. The interchange with I-70 in this newly opened section was not yet complete, and its ramps did not open until the opening of that route's mainline between SR 100/Shadeland Avenue and SR 9 near Greenfield on December 2 of that year. On October 23, 1968, the section of I-465 between Pendleton Pike and 56th Street at Shadeland Avenue was finished and opened to traffic, completing the east leg's eastern bypass of SR 100.

With its alignment controversies now settled, the north leg of I-465 began to take shape in the late 1960s. The section between US 421 (Michigan Road) and US 31 (Meridian Street) was the first on this side of town to see traffic on October 20, 1968. A year to the day later, the segment from US 31 to Keystone Avenue (then SR 431) was opened to motorists. The next month, in November 1969, the north extension of the west leg was completed and signed as I-465 (although it was considered to be "added mileage" by the Federal Highway Administration (FHWA) since it was built to Interstate standards using non-Interstate funds by Indiana), but only the portion between I-65 and 86th Street was opened to traffic because the segment of the north leg to which it would connect was not yet complete. That occurred on August 18, 1970, when the western end of the north leg between I-65 near Royalton and Michigan Road (US 421) was finished and opened to traffic. At that time, the final connection on the north extension of the west leg to 86th Street was also opened, leaving only one remaining gap in the entire I-465 route.

The final section of I-465 to be built was the portion joining the north and east legs between Keystone Avenue (then SR 431) and 56th Street at Shadeland Avenue (then SR 100). This stretch opened to traffic on October 5, 1970, and marked the completion of the I-465 beltway around Indianapolis.

Subsequent improvements and changes
The first of the major postcompletion rebuild and expansion projects occurred from 1999 to 2002, when the heavily traveled northern section of the east leg was modernized and expanded to as many as 13 lanes in one short portion. Concurrently, the east junction with I-70 was rebuilt and reconfigured. In 2000, the Emerson Avenue interchange on the south leg was converted from a conventional diamond to a single-point urban interchange (SPUI), becoming the first SPUI on the I-465 beltway.

Between 2004 and 2005, the north extension of I-465's west leg between I-65 and I-865 was rebuilt to widen and update the freeway in this heavily traveled section located along the western edge of the massive Park 100 commercial and industrial development. This segment was rapidly becoming functionally obsolete due to continued growth of that complex as well as that of other nearby residential and commercial projects in Pike Township. Both interchanges along this stretch, 71st Street (exit 21) and 86th Street (exit 23), were totally rebuilt while remaining open to traffic and had loop ramps added for west-to-south movements. In addition, a new northbound exit ramp was added at exit 21 which bridges over 71st Street to directly deposit motorists onto eastbound 73rd Street. On the mainline, dual auxiliary lanes were added in each travel direction between these interchanges and the 79th Street grade separation over I-465 was demolished and rebuilt to allow for the widened freeway below. Distinctive decorative features were also incorporated into most of the grade separation structures within this project. Also, bicycle paths were established along the southern side of both 86th and 71st streets, which included grade separations with the east-to-south ramps at both interchanges.

In April 2002, the Indiana Department of Transportation (INDOT) announced the redesignation of the dogleg portion of I-465 as I-865. This change eliminated the three-way intersection of I-465 where the north extension of the west leg met the original north leg (at exit 25).

INDOT completed an $800-million (equivalent to $ in ) project called Accelerate 465 to refurbish and reconfigure the original west leg of the loop between July 2007 and December 2012. This project completely rebuilt and added new travel lanes, added auxiliary lanes, rebuilt many grade separations, and reconfigured nearly all of the interchanges along I-465 from just north of the Kentucky Avenue (SR 67 south) interchange to the 56th Street partial interchange. The junction with I-74 and Crawfordsville Road (US 136 west) was reconfigured to allow direct access between I-465 and US 136 for the first time. Interlaced into that design is a full directional connection for I-74, which replaced the former cloverleaf interchange and removed its original stub connector east of I-465 to the intersection of Crawfordsville Road and High School Road in Speedway.

Also in 2007, another undertaking was launched by INDOT to modernize the entire northeastern portion of I-465. All three interchanges along the freeway in this stretch—Keystone Avenue (exit 33), Allisonville Road (exit 35) and I-69/Binford Boulevard (exit 37)—were to be modified and rebuilt. As this project progressed, financial constraints prompted INDOT to scale back its scope. The reconstruction of I-465 between the White River bridge and Fall Creek, including the interchange with I-69, is not scheduled to begin until 2022 under a separate project announced in 2015 and formally relaunched as "Clear Path 465" in 2017. The original, scaled-back project concluded by the end of 2012. The beltway's mainline was reconstructed with additional travel and auxiliary lanes being added in two separate segments—from east of Meridian Street to Allisonville Road and from a point at the southeast end of the I-69/Binford interchange southward to Fall Creek.

The Keystone Avenue partial cloverleaf interchange was reconfigured to allow free-flowing access for most of the movements between I-465 and Keystone. Although Keystone operates as a controlled-access highway both north of I-465 and up to the first junction south of the Interstate, the movements from westbound I-465 to southbound Keystone and from eastbound I-465 to northbound Keystone are not free-flowing but are left turns controlled by traffic lights.

At Allisonville Road, the interchange was converted into a more efficient SPUI configuration. Finally, though the interchange itself was not rebuilt, the I-69/Binford Boulevard junction had two ramps slightly modified to facilitate better traffic flow.

As part of the major project to upgrade  of US 31 in Hamilton County to a full Interstate-standard freeway, the I-465 north leg interchange at Meridian Street (exit 31) was reconfigured between October 2013 and December 2015 (with some additional work continuing until November 22, 2016) to the present partial directional (system interchange) design which allows for free-flow movements to or from the new US 31 freeway to the north.

As part of its Operation Indy Commute project, INDOT began work in 2013 to widen I-65 on both its northbound and southbound mainlines from exit 103 at Southport Road northward to the junction with I-465's south leg, which would also be modified. To reduce congestion at and near that interchange, the loop ramp from westbound I-465 to southbound I-65 was replaced by a flyover ramp. The eastbound I-465 exit to southbound I-65 was also expanded for smoother merging with the new west-to-south flyover. In addition, grade separations over I-465 were replaced on Sherman Drive and Carson Avenue to allow for longer and wider approaches to this busy junction. Most of this work was completed in late 2014.

Memorial designation

Indianapolis native David Letterman had quintuple bypass surgery in 2000, and, two years later, suggested on his show that I-465 should be renamed the David Letterman Bypass, going so far as to call the mayor of Indianapolis during the Late Show with David Letterman. At the time of the gag on his show, Letterman had offered $10 million (equivalent to $ in ) for the honor, later offering just to pay to change the signs.

In 2011 the Indiana General Assembly passed a resolution officially designating I-465 as "USS Indianapolis Memorial Highway" in "the memory of the brave sailors who lost their lives" when USS Indianapolis was sunk in the Pacific during World War II. Signs for this designation have been erected sporadically around the loop, but the highway is still referred to nearly exclusively as "I-465" or simply "465" by most locals.

Future
Upon completion of I-69 between Martinsville and I-465, I-69 will be signed concurrently on I-465 around its south and east legs in Indianapolis—between the new exit 5 for I-69 and SR 37 south on the southwest side and existing exit 37 for I-69 and SR 37 north in the northeast neighborhood of Castleton. 

Remaining sections of the I-465 beltway that are still awaiting reconstruction or widening projects include the west leg junction with I-65, the north leg between I-865 and US 31 north/Meridian Street, the north leg section from Allisonville Road to the I-69/Binford Boulevard interchange (with additional widening south to Fall Creek), and several portions along the south leg.

Exit list

Notes

References

External links

 3-digit Interstates from I-65 (Kurumi.com)

65-4
65-4
465
4
Transportation in Indianapolis
Transportation in Marion County, Indiana
Transportation in Boone County, Indiana
Transportation in Hamilton County, Indiana